Festival moon may be:
Festival Moon (film), 1953 film by Zhu Shilin
Festival Moon, an anthology of short fiction in the Merovingen Nights science fiction series